Maruthanad Elavarasee is a 1950 Indian Tamil-language film directed and edited by A. Kasilingam, and written by M. Karunanidhi. The film stars M. G. Ramachandran (credited as Ramachandar) and V. N. Janaki. It was released on 2 April 1950 and became a box office success.

Plot 

A king has two wives, one of who is Chithra. The minister Dhurjeyan's sister is the younger queen. The two become pregnant and Dhurjeyan persuades the king to believe that the older queen had poisoned the younger queen out of sheer jealousy which the king tends to believe, but does not take any action. Dhurjeyan tries to kill the younger queen but she is saved by a courtier whom Dhurjeyan kills. The younger queen escapes many trials and gives birth to a son named Kandeeban. He grows up and meets a young woman Rani and her friend and falls in love unaware that she is a princess. Their love grows and when he discovers that she is a princess, he begins to distance himself from her. After many trials, the couple reunites.

Cast 

Male cast
 M. G. Ramachandar as Kandeeban
 Pulimootai Ramasami Iyer as Azhagu
 M. G. Chakarapani as Minister Dhurjeyan
 Battling C. S. D. Singh
 P. S. Veerappa as King
 N. S. Narayana Pillai
 T. M. Ramasami Pillai
 Kottapuli Jayaraman
 Vishnu Ramasami Iyengar
 S. M. Thirupathi

Female cast
 V. N. Janaki as Princess Rani
 C. K. Saraswathi as Queen Chithra
 C. K. Nagarathnam as Rani's friend
 K. Meenakshi as Veerathayai Pannivom
Dance
 Lalitha-Padmini

Production 
In 2015, lyricist P. K. Muthusamy claimed he wrote a story and gave it to M. Karunanidhi in December 1949, but Karunanidhi "stole" the story and made it into Maruthanad Elavarasee without Muthusamy's knowledge. However, according to M. G. Ramachandran (known and credited as Ramachandar at that time), T. V. Chari began work on a film titled Kaali Dasi as producer, director and writer, but it was shelved after some progress due to the production company dissolving. Ramachandar added that G. Govindan & Company took over production with A. Kasilingam as director and Karunanidhi as writer, retaining some of the already shot scenes but using them to weave a new story. The new film, titled Maruthanad Elavarasee, was produced by G. Muthuswamy, and Kasilingam also handled the editing while cinematography was handled by G. Dorai.

Soundtrack 
The music composed by M. S. Gnanamani, while lyrics written by C. A. Lakshmana Das & K. P. Kamatchi Sundaram.

Release and reception 
Maruthanad Elavarasee was released on 2 April 1950. The film became a box office success and established Ramachandar and Janaki as a "star pair sure to go places".

References

External links 
 

1950 films
1950s Tamil-language films
Films with screenplays by M. Karunanidhi
Films scored by M. S. Gnanamani